Duke Jing of Jin (died 434 BC) was from 451 to 434 BC the titular ruler of the State of Jin. His ancestral name was Ji, given name Jiao, and Duke Jing was his posthumous title recorded in the Bamboo Annals. The accounts by the Han Dynasty historian Sima Qian in the Records of the Grand Historian are self-contradictory, referring to Duke Jing as Duke Ai of Jin (晉哀公) in one chapter and Duke Yi of Jin (晉懿公) in another.  Modern historians such as Yang Kuan, Ch'ien Mu, and Han Zhaoqi generally consider the Bamboo Annals more reliable, as it was unearthed from the tomb of King Xiang (died 296 BC) of the State of Wei, one of the three successor states of Jin.

Reign
Jin was a major power during the Spring and Autumn period of ancient China, but it had become increasingly dominated by a few aristocratic clans.  In 455 BC, near the end of the reign of Duke Jing's predecessor Duke Chu of Jin, the clans of Han, Zhao, and Wei defeated and annihilated Zhi, the most powerful clan, and effectively partitioned Jin into three new states named after the clans.

The following year, Duke Chu fled to the State of Chu.  Zhao, Han, and Wei, now effectively in control of Jin, installed Jiao, a prince from a cadet branch of the House of Ji that ruled Jin, on the throne.  Jiao, later known as Duke Jing, was a great-grandson of Duke Zhao of Jin.  After 18 years of reign as the titular ruler of Jin, Duke Jing died in 434 BC and was succeeded by his son, Duke You of Jin.

References

Monarchs of Jin (Chinese state)
5th-century BC Chinese monarchs
434 BC deaths
Year of birth unknown